The National Television of Cambodia (TVK) is the national television station of Cambodia. It is owned and operated by the government of Cambodia in Phnom Penh together with the national radio station, National Radio of Cambodia (RNK). TVK is member of the Asia-Pacific Broadcasting Union (ABU).

TVK broadcasts nine hours on weekdays and seventeen hours on weekends. On weekdays it is separated into two sessions, morning session from 11:30 to 14:30, and evening session from 17:00 to 23:00, and on weekends it broadcasts in one section from 6:00 to 23:00. Reruns are also broadcast at night.

History
In 1946 Radio Cambodge opened in Phnom Penh, at the time part of French Indochina (French protectorate of Cambodia), using Japanese equipment. After independence it became Radiodiffusion Nationale Khmère (RNK). TV test transmissions started in 1961, regular transmissions on 2 February 1966. Subsequent names include Voice/TV Station of the National United Front of Cambodia (1975) and Voice of the Kampuchean People (VOKP, 1979). In 1983 a Radio and Television Commission was created. In 1994 state TV and radio were placed under the Ministry of Information and separated into different organizations.

List of stations

Radio (RNK)

Central Station (Phnom Penh) 
 AM Radio: AM 918 kHz (power: 600 kw)
 FM Radio: Wat Phnom FM 105.7 MHz (power: 20 kw)
Both stations carry English and French news at 1:00 pm and 7:00 pm local time.

Regional FM Stations 

 88.1 – Tbong Khmum
 89.3 – Kampong Speu
 89.5 – Ratanakiri
 90.5 – Pailin
 91.5 – Oddar Meanchey
 92.3 – Kampong Chhnang
 92.5 – Kampong Cham
 92.5 – Takeo
 92.7 – Battambang
 93.0 – Sihanoukville
 94.0 – Banteay Meanchey
 96.0 – Phnom Penh
 97.0 – Mondulkiri
 97.0 – Preah Vihear
 97.3 – Prey Veng
 98.3 – Kampong Thom
 98.5 – Kratie
 98.5 – Pursat
 98.7 – Svay Rieng
 99.0 – Kep
 99.0 – Stung Treng
 99.7 – Kampot
 103.0 – Siem Reap

Television (TVK)

Television Station Network 
 TVK
 TVK2 (educational; launched on 20 April 2020)

Central Station (Phnom Penh) 
 VHF-Channel 7 (TVK; power: 10 kw)

Regional Stations 
 Battambang – VHF-Channel 7 (TVK Battambang) from Battambang
 Koh Kong – VHF-Channel 7 (TVK Koh Kong) from Koh Kong
 Kratie – VHF-Channel 7 (TVK Kratie) from Kratie
 Mondulkiri – VHF-Channel 7 (TVK Mondulkiri) from Senmonorom
 Preah Vihear – VHF-Channel 7 (TVK Preah Vihear) from Tbeng Meanchey
 Pursat – VHF-Channel 10 (TVK Pursat) from Pursat (national relay)
 Ratanakiri – VHF-Channel 7 (TVK Ratanakiri) from Banlung
 Siem Reap – VHF-Channel 12 (TVK Siem Reap) from Siem Reap
 Sihanoukville – UHF-Channel 53 (TVK Sihanoukville) from Sihanoukville
 Stung Treng – VHF-Channel 7 (TVK Stung Treng) from Stung Treng

See also
Media of Cambodia

References

External links
 Official website

Mass media companies of Cambodia
Television stations in Cambodia
Television channels and stations established in 1966